Liu Jiang (Wade–Giles: Liu Chiang) may refer to:

 Liu River or Liu Jiang, Guangxi, China
 Liu Jiang (politician) (born 1940), Minister of Agriculture of China
 Liu Jiang (director) (born 1969), Chinese director

See also
 Liujiang District, Guangxi, China
 Liujiang man, early modern humans found in East Asia